Charles Christopher "Hondo" Campbell (August 24, 1948 – February 8, 2016) was a United States Army officer who served as the 17th Commanding General, United States Army Forces Command (FORSCOM). He previously served as FORSCOM's Deputy Commanding General and Chief of Staff from April 26, 2006, to  January 8, 2007. He assumed the commanding general assignment January 9, 2007, and completed it on June 3, 2010.

Early life and education
Campbell was born in Shreveport, Louisiana, where his brother, James H. Campbell, III, is an attorney. He earned his commission through Reserve Officers' Training Corps at Louisiana State University in Baton Rouge, from which he received a Bachelor of Arts degree in History. His initial assignment was as an instructor at the Infantry Training Command (provisional), United States Army Training Center Infantry in Fort Ord, California.

Military career
After Special Forces training, Campbell went on to teach tactics at Forces Armeé National Khmere Training Command, Army Advisory Group, Phouc Tuy Training Battalion, United States Army, Vietnam. He subsequently served as an A-Detachment Executive Officer and Commander in Vietnam. His succeeding commands include a Combat Support Company in the 2d Armored Division, Fort Hood, Texas; an armor battalion in the 3d Armored Division – 2/67AR, United States Army Europe and a heavy brigade in the 2nd Infantry Division, Eighth Army, South Korea. He was also the Commanding General of the 7th Infantry Division at Fort Carson, Colorado and the Commanding General, Eighth United States Army, South Korea.

Campbell's staff assignments included service as Operations Officer, 3–63 Armor, Augsburg, Germany; Chief, Exercise Branch, 3d Infantry Division, Wuerzburg, Germany; Plans and Operations Officer, Combined Field Army, Republic of Korea; Senior Task Force Observer/Controller and later Deputy Commander, Operations Group, Combat Maneuver Training Center, Hohenfels, Germany; Chief of Staff, 2d Infantry Division (Mechanized), Eighth Army, South Korea; Assistant Division Commander, 1st Cavalry Division, Fort Hood, Texas; Chief of Staff, I Corps and Fort Lewis, Fort Lewis, Washington; Deputy Commanding General, Third Army, Fort McPherson, Georgia; Chief of Staff, United States Army Europe and Seventh Army, Germany; Chief of Staff, United States Central Command; and Chief of Staff, United Nations Command, Combined Forces Command, and United States Forces Korea.

Campbell received a Master of Military Art and Science from the United States Army Command and General Staff College. He attended a wide variety of military schools, including the School of Advanced Military Studies in 1986, as well as the Army War College in 1991. He retired from the army on June 3, 2010. At the time of his retirement, he was the last active general officer who had served in the Vietnam War.

Campbell died on February 8, 2016, at the age of sixty-seven in Shreveport, where he returned after retiring from the military to live with his wife, Betty Dianne Campbell.

Military awards and decorations
His military awards and decorations include:

References

1948 births
2016 deaths
United States Army personnel of the Vietnam War
Louisiana State University alumni
United States Army Command and General Staff College alumni
United States Army War College alumni
Recipients of the Distinguished Service Medal (US Army)
Recipients of the Legion of Merit
United States Army generals
Recipients of the Defense Superior Service Medal
People from Shreveport, Louisiana
Louisiana Republicans
20th-century American Episcopalians
Military personnel from Louisiana